Henry John "Zeke" Bonura (September 20, 1908 – March 9, 1987) was a first baseman in Major League Baseball. From 1934 through 1940, he played for the Chicago White Sox (1934–1937), Washington Senators (1938, 1940), New York Giants (1939) and Chicago Cubs (1940). Bonura batted and threw right-handed. He was born in New Orleans.

In a seven-season career, Bonura posted a .307 batting average (1099-for-3582) with 119 home runs and 704 RBI in 917 games played. Defensively, he was a good first baseman, recording a career .992 fielding percentage.

One of Bonura's more noteworthy athletic accomplishments has nothing to do with the sport of baseball. In June 1925, at the age of sixteen, Bonura became the youngest male athlete ever to win an event at the National (AAU) Track and Field Championships. He threw the javelin 65.18 meters (213-10) to claim the title. Bonura's winning effort was a meet record by nearly twenty-feet; a prodigious mark that remained on the books until 1930.

Military service
in 1941, Bonura joined the army and was stationed at Camp Shelby, Mississippi. With the outbreak of World War II, he was recalled to active duty, and returned to Camp Shelby where he was in charge of organizing baseball. In mid 1943, he was posted to Oran, Algeria. He organized large-scale baseball operations, consisting of 150 teams in 6 leagues. Playoffs among the teams narrowed them to two finalists – the Casablanca Yankees, consisting of medics, and the Algiers Streetwalkers, consisting of MPs. The North African World Series was a best two-out-of-three-game championship played on October 3 and 4, 1943, at Eugene Stadium in Algiers, Algeria, between the two teams. The Casablanca Yankees won the series in two straight games. The winners were presented with baseballs autographed by General Eisenhower, and the winning team received a trophy made from an unexploded Italian bomb.

In mid 1945, Bonura was discharged from the army with the rank of master sergeant. He received the Legion of Merit medal while serving in the US Army during World War II, for his work as athletic director for the Army in Algeria in 1943 in 1944.

Highlights
 Hit .300 or more in four of his seven major league seasons, with a career-high .345 in 1937, fourth in the American League, behind Charlie Gehringer (.371), Lou Gehrig (.351) and Joe DiMaggio (.346).
 Averaged 17 home runs per season, with a career-high 27 in his 1934 rookie season, setting a White Sox team record. The record was tied by Joe Kuhel in 1940 and surpassed by Gus Zernial in 1950 with 29.
 Averaged 100 runs batted in per season, with a career high 138 RBI in 1936 with the Chicago White Sox, a team record that stood until 1998, which was broken by Albert Belle with 152.
 Led American League first baseman in fielding percentage in 1934, 1936, and 1938.
 Member of the Italian American Sports Hall of Fame

College career
Bonura did not play baseball at Loyola New Orleans because the university did not field a team. Instead he lettered in basketball, football, and track and field.

See also
 List of athletes on Wheaties boxes

References

External links

 Zeke Bonura - Baseballbiography.com
 List of National Champions: Men's Javelin Throw
 

1908 births
1987 deaths
American people of Italian descent
Brother Martin High School alumni
Loyola Wolf Pack men's basketball players
Loyola Wolf Pack football players
American male javelin throwers
Baseball players from New Orleans
Basketball coaches from Louisiana
Basketball players from New Orleans
Major League Baseball first basemen
Chicago White Sox players
Washington Senators (1901–1960) players
New York Giants (NL) players
Chicago Cubs players
New Orleans Pelicans (baseball) players
Indianapolis Indians players
Dallas Steers players
Minneapolis Millers (baseball) players
Thibodaux Giants players
Stamford Bombers players
Stamford Pioneers players
Kingston Ponies players
Midland Indians players
Loyola Wolf Pack men's basketball coaches
Minneapolis Millers (baseball) managers
United States Army personnel of World War II
American men's basketball players
United States Army non-commissioned officers
Recipients of the Legion of Merit
American military sports coaches